is a 2014 Japanese 3D computer-animated science fiction comedy drama film based on the Doraemon manga series and directed by Ryūichi Yagi and Takashi Yamazaki. It was released on 8 August 2014. It is the highest-grossing film of the Doraemon franchise. Bang Zoom! Entertainment premiered an English-dubbed version of the film at the Tokyo International Film Festival on 24 October 2014. The English version features the cast of the Disney XD show Doraemon: Gadget Cat From the Future. A different English version with local actors was distributed by Multivision Pictures Entertainment and VIVA International Pictures for a Filipino audience in 2015. It is therefore the first of 2 Doraemon films to be dubbed into English.

Stand by Me Doraemon was commercially successful in Japan. It was number-one on the box office charts for five consecutive weeks and was the second highest-grossing Japanese anime film of 2014 in Japan, with a box office total of $183.4 million, behind Disney's Frozen. In February 2015, the film won the Japan Academy Prize for Animation of the Year at the 38th Japan Academy Prize.

A sequel was released on 20 November 2020 in Japan.

Plot

Nobita Nobi is a fifth grader who constantly gets failing grades in his subjects due to his laziness and is always bullied by his classmates Suneo Honekawa and Takeshi 'Gian' Goda. His great-great-grandson from the 22nd century, Sewashi, who watches him every day, travels to Nobita's timeline while bringing along his robotic cat Doraemon. Sewashi reveals that if Nobita keeps up his act, he will have a disastrous future: he will marry Gian's sister Jaiko, have his private company burned down, and will be left with great debt. To circumvent this, he orders Doraemon to help Nobita, modifying Doraemon's nose to prevent him from returning to the future unless Nobita gains a better future.

Being reluctant until the threat, Doraemon introduces his gadgets to help Nobita which helps him immensely. Though Doraemon warns Nobita not to be too dependent on his gadgets, Nobita asks Doraemon to help him woo his crush, Shizuka Minamoto whom Doraemon reveals is the one Nobita will marry if his future is corrected. However, all his efforts end up making Shizuka become closer to ace student, Hidetoshi Dekisugi. Nobita's attempt to be equal with Dekisugi by studying harder is futile, and he decides to let go of Shizuka to make her happier. He does this by flipping Shizuka's skirt to reveal her underwear (but not looking at it), resulting in Shizuka screaming and holding her skirt down in embarrassment before slapping him and running away in tears. After a while, Shizuka realizes that Nobita had his eyes shut when he did this to her. This makes her start worrying about Nobita. She overhears Gian and Suneo's conversation about Nobita's self-esteem getting crushed by Sensei for recently failing another test, causing her to believe he is planning to commit suicide, Shizuka arrives at the Nobi residence and resists Nobita's people-repelling potion to help him, which Doraemon reveals is the first step in Nobita and Shizuka's growing relationship to eventually becoming a couple.

After seeing his older self rejecting Shizuka's invitation to a mountain climbing, Nobita disguises himself as his older self to help Shizuka, who becomes separated from her group during a heavy blizzard. His efforts to help Shizuka do more harm to himself, but this makes Shizuka feel that she has to accompany Nobita, saying "Yes" before collapsing from the cold she contracted from her earlier conversation with Nobita. Forcing himself to remember the moment, the two are rescued by Nobita's older self, who recalled the memory. Nobita learns from his older self that Shizuka was answering to latter's proposition to marry her. It means that Shizuka will indeed marry Nobita. After hearing that Shizuka's father has also accepted Nobita as his daughter's spouse, Nobita and Doraemon return to the present timeline. Nobita visits Shizuka declaring that he will make her happy whatever it takes.

As Nobita's future has been changed for the better, Doraemon's programming commands him to return to the future in 48 hours. Noticing that Doraemon has a hard time leaving due to his worry for Nobita, Nobita confronts and has a brutal fight with Gian to prove that he is able to defend himself without Doraemon. Seeing that Nobita refuses to give up, Gian forfeits as Doraemon tearfully takes Nobita home before leaving in peace the next day. During April Fools, Nobita is tricked by Gian into believing that Doraemon has returned. In anger, he drinks a solution Doraemon gave to him, which makes the opposite of everything the consumer says comes true. Finishing his retribution against Suneo (who was chased by a dog trying to bite him) and Gian (who was being dragged away by his mother, who was preparing to punish him), Nobita goes back home while lamenting that Doraemon will never return. To his surprise, Doraemon suddenly returns and tells Nobita that he has gotten permission to stay with him because Nobita said that Doraemon would never return, still with the effects of the potion, and it became a truth. They both hug and cry in happiness.

Production
In 2011, the producers said that, "Different from the other Doraemon films, this will be a special film". The production team spent 18 months on the character design and CGI animation began after the film recorded the voice of characters.

Adaptation 
The plot combines elements from the short stories "All the Way from the Country of the Future", "Imprinting Egg", "Goodbye, Shizuka-chan", "Romance in Snowy Mountain", "Nobita's the Night Before a Wedding" and "Goodbye, Doraemon..." into a new complete story – from the first time Doraemon came to Nobita's house to Doraemon bidding farewell to Nobita.

Voice cast

Soundtrack

Original Japanese 
In the movie, most of the soundtrack was composed  by Naoki Sato composer (except the ending theme) 

Ending theme: Himawari no Yakusoku (ひまわりの約束, lit. "Promise from Sunflower") by Motohiro Hata

Release
The film was released in Japan on 8 August 2014, in Italy on 6 November 2014. In Indonesia and Singapore, the film was released on 10 and 11 December 2014, respectively. In Spain and Taiwan, the film was released on 19 December 2014. In Thailand, the film was released on 31 December 2014. In Malaysia, the film was released on 29 January 2015 and in Hong Kong, the film was released on 5 February 2015. The film was released in Vietnam on 12 December 2014, with broadcast on 1 June 2015 by K+ NS The film was released in the Philippines on 17 June 2015, announced by SM Cinema on Facebook, distributed by VIVA International pictures & Multivision Pictures Entertainment. The film was released in Turkey on 11 September 2015 The film was released in China on Thursday, 28 May 2015 becoming the first and only Japanese film to be released in China after Ultraman in July 2012 in three years. Altogether, the film was released in 60 countries worldwide. The film was released in the US on Netflix on December 24, 2021.

In  Japan, the film was released on Blu-ray, in a deluxe and normal edition, and DVD by Pony Canyon on 18 February 2015. The DVDs and Blu-rays released in Hong Kong feature English subtitles. The iTunes release in Singapore also includes English subtitles.

Reception

Box office
Outside Japan, the highest revenue came from China ($86.92 million), Hong Kong ($5.1 million), South Korea ($3.3 million), Italy ($3.2 million), Indonesia ($3 million) and Thailand ($1.2 million).

In Japan, the film earned ¥767 million in the first 2 days and ¥988 million after 3 days. After 40 days, the film earned ¥7 billion and ¥8 billion after 76 days. The film – after the release day – was ranked 1st in cinemas in Japan for 5 weeks continuous. As of December 2014, the film earned ¥8.38 billion ($70 million) in Japan.

The film performed well in Hong Kong, which was partly boosted by the sudden death of the long-time voice actor of Doraemon, Lam Pou-chuen, a month before the movie's local release. It became the all-time highest-grossing Japanese film in Hong Kong (breaking Rings record), the highest-grossing film of the Chinese New Year period in Hong Kong (from 18 to 21 February) and the all-time fourth highest-grossing animated film in Hong Kong, behind Pixars Toy Story 3, Monster's University and Inside Out. It also broke the opening day record (previously held by Ponyo on a Cliff). In China, the film scored a single-day record of US$14.2 million (breaking Kung Fu Panda 2s record) and a four-day opening record of US$38.5 million (breaking How to Train Your Dragon 2s record). In just five days it earned $53 million to become the highest grossing non-Hollywood animated film in China (breaking Boonie Bears: Mystical Winters record). It is currently the third highest-grossing animated film in China ($86.9 million), behind Kung Fu Panda 2 ($92.2 million) and Big Hero 6 ($86.7 million).

A web survey was published, giving a closer look at the attendees. The audience consisted of 20.4% were children, 21.5% were in their 20s, 20.4% were in their 30s, 20.4% were in their 40s. 47% were male while 53% were female.

Accolades

Related products

 New translation "Doraemon"
Fujiko · F · Fujio (writer), Hiroshi Sasaki (editor), Fujiko Pro (monitoring) 
A book containing 7 short stories, with commentary by Hiroshi Sasaki.

  Stand by Me Doraemon Animation Visual Story
Fujiko F. Fujio (Writer) 
Adapted from the film

 BD / DVD
Released 18 February 2015 with PCXE-50408 (BD special version), PCXE-50409 (BD Normal version), PCBE-54251 (DVD Limit Version)

 Cultural impact 

On the Japanese talk show Room of Tetsuko, Doraemon in 3D image was invited to interview and was broadcast on television on 8 August 2014.

The film helped ease diplomatic tensions between China and Japan.  Nagoya University professor Kawamura Noriyuki said that the film was able to help the Chinese people have a better look at the Japanese people.

 Sequel 

On 12 December 2019, the sequel, Stand By Me Doraemon 2, was announced. Ryūichi Yagi and Takashi Yamazaki return as directors, with Yamazaki once again penning the script. Largely based on Doraemon's 2000 short film Doraemon: A Grandmother's Recollections'', it was originally slated to be released on 7 August 2020, but due to the COVID-19 pandemic the release was postponed to 20 November 2020.

See also
 List of Doraemon films

References

External links

  
  
  
 First trailer on YouTube 
 Official Movie Website  on Toho 
 Official Book Website  
 
 

2014 3D films
2014 anime films
2014 computer-animated films
2014 films
2010s science fiction films
Doraemon films
Animated films about friendship
Films directed by Takashi Yamazaki
IMAX films
Japanese 3D films
Japan Academy Prize for Animation of the Year winners
Shirogumi
Shin-Ei Animation
Japanese computer-animated films
Japanese animated science fiction films
Films scored by Naoki Satō
Animated films about time travel
Toho animated films